The 2014–15 Gardner–Webb Runnin' Bulldogs men's basketball team represented Gardner–Webb University during the 2014–15 NCAA Division I men's basketball season. The Runnin' Bulldogs, led by second year head coach Tim Craft, played their home games at the Paul Porter Arena and were members of the Big South Conference. They finished the season 20–15, 10–8 in Big South play to finish in a tie for sixth place. They advanced to the semifinals of the Big South tournament where they lost to Coastal Carolina. They were invited to the College Basketball Invitational where they lost in the first round to Colorado.

Roster

Schedule

|-
!colspan=9 style="background:#9C0606; color:#000000;"| Regular season

|-
!colspan=9 style="background:#9C0606; color:#000000;"| Big South tournament

|-
!colspan=9 style="background:#9C0606; color:#000000;"| College Basketball Invitational

References

Gardner–Webb Runnin' Bulldogs men's basketball seasons
Gardner-Webb
Gardner-Webb
2014 in sports in North Carolina
2015 in sports in North Carolina